Conservation Board may refer to:

Conservation Board (New Zealand), boards around New Zealand that provide for interaction between the public and Department of Conservation
Colorado Water Conservation Board, a division of the Colorado Department of Natural Resources
Energy Resources Conservation Board, an independent, quasi-judicial agency of the Government of Alberta
Sussex Downs Conservation Board, an English local government organisation to promote and manage the Sussex Downs Area of Outstanding Natural Beauty
Texas State Soil and Water Conservation Board, a state agency that enforces the Texas's soil and water conservation laws
 Western Cape Nature Conservation Board, governmental organisation responsible for maintaining wilderness areas and public nature reserves in Western Cape Province, South Africa